The Victorian Medical Women's Society (VMWS) is the longest-running association of women medical practitioners and medical students. It was established in Melbourne, Australia in 1895/1896 and is one of the oldest active medical organisations in the world. The aim of the society was to set a benchmark in women's health around Victoria, and to advance the professional development of medical women, through education, research, and the improvement of professional opportunities.  The state-run society became affiliated with the national body, Australian Federation of Medical Women (since 1927), and thereby the Medical Women's International Association.

History  
Dr Constance Stone, the first woman to practice medicine in Australia, founded the Victorian Medical Women's Society in 1895/96. It was founded with the aim to further the professional development of medical women by education, research and improvement of professional opportunities. Soon after its foundation, its aims evolved to promote and advocate the health and welfare of all Australians, particularly women and children.

Queen Victoria Hospital 
The founders of the Victorian Medical Women's Society established The Victoria Hospital – one of the first hospitals worldwide to be run by women, for women. This clinic was run from the hall of The Welsh Church, at 320 La Trobe Street, Melbourne, where Constance Stone's husband Dr/Reverend Egryn Jones presided. Here, the founders of the society volunteered their expertise and treated the poorest of women at no cost. Their services were in high demand with over two thousand patients presenting to the clinic in its first three months of opening. To expand their services the society established the Queen's Shilling Fund, where every woman in the state of Victoria was asked to donate a shilling to fund a new hospital. This campaign, largely arranged by suffragist Annette 'Annie' Bear-Crawford, was very successful and The Queen Victoria Hospital was born at Mint Place a year later. In 1946 it was relocated to a much larger premises at the site of the former Melbourne General Hospital on Lonsdale Street (now The Queen Victoria Village). By 1951 it was the biggest women's hospital in the British Commonwealth. In 1986 the hospital became part of the Monash Medical Centre as part of moves to decentralise hospital services.

First World War 
At the time of the onset of the First World War, many Australian women doctors wanted to support the war effort by providing their much-needed skills in assisting the sick and wounded. However, as women, they were not permitted enlistment in both the Australian or Royal Army Medical Corps.  Six members of the Victorian Medical Women's Society sought alternative means to provide their services, through military services established by medical women overseas. These notable women, including Mary de Garis, Helen Sexton, and Vera Scantlebury are honoured with a memorial plaque which was placed at The Welsh Church in 2016.

Members

Foundational members included 

 Emma 'Constance' Stone (1856–1902)
 Grace 'Clara' Stone (1860–1957)
 Mary Page Stone (1865–1910)
 Lilian Helen Alexander (1861–1934)
 Janet 'Jenny' Lindsay Greig (1874–1950)
 Jane 'Jean' Stocks Greig (1872–1939)
 Hannah Mary 'Helen' Sexton (1862–1950)
 Grace Vale (1860–1933)
 Ida 'Gertrude' Halley (1867–1939)

Other notable members 

 Helen Edith Barrett (1872–1939) - General Practitioner, known best for the founding of the Bush Nursing Association of Victoria and her work with The Australian Red Cross and National Council of Women
 Constance Ellis (1872–1942) - Obstetrician and gynaecologist, and first woman to graduate from the University of Melbourne as a Doctor of Medicine
 Mary Clementina De Garis  (1881–1963) - Obstetrician
 Vera Scantlebury (1889–1946) - Physician, Surgeon, Anaesthetist, Director of Infant Welfare Vic Gov. Known best for her work in maternal and child welfare 
 Dame Kate Isabel Campbell (1899–1986) - Paediatrician, best known for her research in excessive supplemental oxygen causing blindness in premature neonates
 Mary Glowrey (1887–1957) - First Catholic religious sister to practice as a doctor (in obstetrics, gynaecology, and ophthalmology), best known for her medical and social work with women in Guntur, India
 Dame Annie 'Jean' MacNamara (1899–1968) - Paediatrician, best known for her contributions to children's health and welfare, and research on polio
 Jean Littlejohn (1899–1990) - Ear Nose Throat Surgeon
 Lorna Lloyd-Green (1910–2002) - Obstetrician and Gynaecologist, first female fellow of the Australian Medical Association, advocate for equal pay
 Lorna Verdun Sisley (1916–2004) - General Surgeon
 Lena McEwan (1927–2011) - First female plastic surgeon in Australia
 Dame Joyce Daws (1925–2007) - Thoracic surgeon

References 

Healy J, Alexander E, Best JD, Gunn J (2013) Strength of mind :125 years of women in medicine. Medical History Museum, University of Melbourne.
McRae H (2015) Dinner With the Devil - Women and Melbourne's Queen Vic: Their Pride and Shame, Joy and Sorrow. BookBaby Publishing, Australia.
Murnane M (2015) Honourable healers : pioneering women doctors : Elizabeth Blackwell, Elizabeth Garrett Anderson and Constance Stone. Australian Scholarly Publishing, Australia.
Sheard H (2016) A Heart Undivided, The life of Dr Vera Scantlebury Brown. Faculty of Medicine, Dentistry and Health Sciences University of Melbourne
Sheard H, Lee R (2019) Women to the Front. Penguin Random House Publishing, Sydney

External links

Medical and health organisations based in Victoria (Australia)
Organizations for women in science and technology